Pressure Bay is an arm of Robertson Bay, 3 nautical miles (6 km) wide, lying between Cape Wood and Birthday Point along the north coast of Victoria Land. Charted and named in 1911 by the Northern Party, led by Campbell, of the British Antarctic Expedition, 1910–13. The Northern Party experienced great difficulty in sledging across the pressure ice fringing the shore of Robertson Bay. This pressure was caused by the adjacent Shipley Glacier descending to the sea ice.

Bays of Victoria Land
Pennell Coast